LJW or ljw may refer to:

 League of Jewish Women, a voluntary Jewish women's service organisation in the United Kingdom
 ljw, the ISO 639-3 code for Yirandhali language, Queensland, Australia